Scantlebury Skate Park is a public skatepark built in Scantlebury Park in the Dixwell neighborhood of New Haven, Connecticut. The park opened in 2020.

Park history 
Ella B. Scantlebury Park was named after New Haven's first African-American and first woman City Treasurer, Ella Scantlebury.

Building campaign 
The Scantlebury Skatepark was conceived of by two New Haven residents and skateboard enthusiasts, Steve Roberts and J. Joseph, Yale class of 2019. The city of New Haven supported the campaign. Roberts and Joseph garnered funding for their project with $50,000 from The Could Be Fund and a $25,000 donation from Yale's Schwarzman Center. Despite an initial pushback from some members of the community, the Scantlebury Skatepark opened in 2020 and is well used and loved by the community.

Construction 
Bridgeport-based Rampage skateboard company built the skatepark.

References 

Parks in New Haven, Connecticut
Skateparks in the United States